James Pearson was a 19th-century English railway engineer. He is best remembered as the designer of the distinctive Bristol and Exeter Railway 4-2-4T locomotives.

Career

South Devon Railway
James Pearson was the engineer responsible for the daily operations of Isambard Kingdom Brunel's ill-fated atmospheric equipment on the South Devon Railway. Trains only ran in service from 13 September 1847 to 9 September 1848, but he was retained while the equipment was disposed of.

Bristol and Exeter Railway
In May 1850 he became the Bristol and Exeter Railway's Locomotive Engineer. Under his control the railway set up new locomotive works at Bristol Temple Meads. These opened in 1851 and built most of the railway's new broad gauge locomotives from 1859.

Locomotives designs
The most significant locomotives designed by James Pearson were:
 1851 Bristol and Exeter Railway 2-2-2T locomotives – 7 small tank locomotives
 1854 Bristol and Exeter Railway 4-2-4T locomotives – 8 locomotives with 9 feet wheels
 1855 Bristol and Exeter Railway 4-4-0ST locomotives – 26 saddle tank locomotives
 1856 Bristol and Exeter Railway 0-6-0 locomotives – 6 goods locomotives
 1859 Bristol and Exeter Railway 4-2-4T locomotives – 2 locomotives with 7 feet 6 inch wheels
 1868 Bristol and Exeter Railway 4-2-4T locomotives – 4  locomotives with 8 feet 10 inch wheels
 1870 Bristol and Exeter Railway 2-4-0 locomotives – 10 passenger locomotives
 1874 Bristol and Exeter Railway 2-4-0 locomotives – 3 convertible passenger locomotives

See also
South Devon Railway engine houses

References
 
 
 

Locomotive builders and designers
English railway mechanical engineers
Year of death missing
Year of birth missing